AD 96 (XCVI) was a leap year starting on Friday (link will display the full calendar) of the Julian calendar. At the time, it was known as the Year of the Consulship of Valens and Vetus (or, less frequently, year 849 Ab urbe condita). The denomination AD 96 for this year has been used since the early medieval period, when the Anno Domini calendar era became the prevalent method in Europe for naming years.

Events

By place

Roman Empire 
 September 18 – Emperor Domitian is stabbed to death by a freedman at the age 44 after a 15-year reign, in a palace conspiracy involving officers of the Praetorian Guard. The Flavian Dynasty ends. 
 Nerva is declared emperor by the Roman Senate as the new ruler of the Roman Empire. He recalls citizens exiled by Domitian; this is the beginning of the Era of the Five Good Emperors. The Antonines Dynasty starts.
 Marcus Ulpius Traianus becomes governor of Upper Germany.
 The Arch of Titus is completed in Rome.

By topic

Art and Science 
 End of the period covered by Tacitus in his Histories.

Religion 
 The Book of Revelation is written (approximate date).
 A schism in Buddhism creates a new, popular religion in India, Mahâyâna ("Great Vehicle").
</onlyinclude>

Births 
 Lucius Minicius Natalis Quadronius Verus, Roman statesman

Deaths 
 September 18 – Domitian, Roman emperor (b. AD 51)
 Gaius Manlius Valens, Roman senator and consul (b. AD 6)
 Publius Papinius Statius, Roman poet (approximate date)

References 

0096